Rhynie  is a small town in South Australia, halfway between Tarlee and Auburn, along the Horrocks Highway. It was surveyed and founded in 1859.

Rhynie was on the Spalding railway line, which has now been closed and replaced by the Rattler Rail Trail cycling and walking path.

The town is within the District Council of Clare and Gilbert Valleys area.

Missionary, Annie Lock, was born in Rhynie.

References

Towns in South Australia
Mid North (South Australia)